The Three Masks (French: Les trois masques) is a 1921 French silent drama film directed by Henry Krauss and starring Krauss, Henri Rollan and Gine Avril. It is based on the 1908 play of the same title by Charles Méré. The film was remade in 1929 as one of the earliest French sound films.

Cast
 Henry Krauss as Della Corda
 Henri Rollan as Paolo Della Corba
 Gine Avril as Speranza
 Charlotte Barbier-Krauss as Signora Della Corda
 Georges Wague as Sebastiano
 Maurice Schutz as Luigi

References

Bibliography
 Goble, Alan. The Complete Index to Literary Sources in Film. Walter de Gruyter, 1999.

External links 
 

1921 films
1921 drama films
French drama films
French silent feature films
1920s French-language films
Films set in Corsica
French films based on plays
Films directed by Henry Krauss
Pathé films
Silent drama films
1920s French films